Sven M.G. Koopmans (Amsterdam, 1973) is a Dutch international lawyer, diplomat and former politician currently serving as the European Union Special Representative for the Middle East Peace Process (EUSR MEPP).  Dr. Koopmans has published several books and is the author of the first and only practical guide to negotiating peace. 

His father, Aart Koopmans, founded the Alternative Elfstedentocht.

Career
In his role as EUSR, he is charged with providing an active contribution to the final settlement of the Israeli-Palestinian conflict based on a two-state solution, in line with the UNSCR 2334 (2016). He reports directly to the High Representative of the Union for Foreign Affairs and Security Policy, Josep Borrell, on this issue and maintains an overview of all EU regional activities linked to the Middle East Peace Process.

From 2017 to 2021 Dr. Koopmans was a Member of Parliament for the People's Party for Freedom and Democracy, first as spokesman on legal affairs, then on foreign affairs and military missions.  He was Head of Delegation to the NATO Parliamentary Assembly, President of the Dutch-French Contact Group, Chair of the Parliamentary Commission on Requests and Citizen Initiatives, and Member of the Parliamentary Assembly of the Council of Europe, and the OSCE Parliamentary Assembly.. Dr. Koopmans is a Knight of the Legion of Honor; he received this award in 2022 for his work as Chair of the Dutch-French Contact Group. 

During his time as a Member of Parliament Dr. Koopmans submitted an amendment to the Dutch Constitution, adding a preamble to the Constitution. His amendment was approved in second reading by the Dutch Senate in July 2022 and entered into force after publication in August 2022. 

Between 2003 and 2016 he was political and legal advisor in peace processes, border conflict mediation and constitutional review processes under the auspices of the European Union, United Nations, African Union and OSCE, among others, including in Cyprus, Darfur, Mali, Ukraine and Guyana/Venezuela. Between 2014 and 2016 he was senior mediation expert to the UN Special Envoy for Syria, between 2011 and 2013 advisor to the EU Special Representative for Sudan and South Sudan, and from 2008 to 2009 to the International Civilian Representative in Kosovo. Between 2001 and 2008 Dr. Koopmans was also a barrister (advocaat) at the global law firm of Clifford Chance LLP, specializing in international litigation. In 2000 he advised Bosnia and Herzegovina at the United Nations in New York on negotiations on the Rome Statute, the treaty establishing the International Criminal Court. 

Dr. Koopmans has taught peace negotiations at Leiden University and Aix-Marseille III. He speaks Dutch, English, French and German

Academic background and publications
Dr Koopmans obtained Master's degrees in law and political science at Leiden University (1997) and a Master's degree (1998) and a Doctorate (2007) at Oxford University, the latter for his thesis Diplomatic Dispute Settlement (T.M.C. Asser Press, 2008). He also studied at Sciences Po Paris (1993), Harvard University (1995) and New York University (2000).

During his time in Leiden University he was a member of Mordenate College.

Books 

 'Diplomatic Dispute Settlement: The Use of Inter-State Conciliation'(T.M.C. Asser Press, 2008).
 "Negotiating Peace: A Guide to the Practice, Politics, and Law of International Mediation" (Oxford, University Press, 2018). 
 "Koopman, Dominee Generaal: nationaal belang buitenlandbeleid en de nieuwe wereldorde" (Boom uitgevers Amsterdam, 2021).

Media 

Opinion: 'The EU is Israel's Friend. But the Occupation Limits Our Potential', Haaretz, 1 September 2022.
 Special interview: Abraham Accords have "not fundamentally changed Palestinians" situation', says EU envoy. Arab News, 24 August 2022.
 Profiel: ''Koopman, Dominee, Generaal', Sven Koopmans verlaat de politiek met een pleidooi voor realisme', Volkskrant, 15 January 2019.
 "We zijn dan wel ethisch, maar straks zijn we ook dood" NRC Handelsblad, 5 december 2019.
 "Hoe maak je vrede: lessen van een vredesonderhandelaar", NRC Handelsblad, 15 februari 2016.

External Links 

 EU Special Representatives, EEAS.
 Sven Koopmans, LinkedIn.

References

1973 births
Living people
People's Party for Freedom and Democracy politicians